The Chief Minister of Khyber Pakhtunkhwa is the head of Government of Khyber Pakhtunkhwa and is elected by the Provincial Assembly of the Khyber Pakhtunkhwa. The Chief Minister is elected by Khyber Pakhtunkhwa assembly for maximum of 5 years. Previously the province was named as NWFP.

Parties 

  Caretaker 
  Pakistan Muslim League
  Jamiat Ulema-e-Islam 
  Pakistan Peoples Party 
  Islami Jamhoori Ittehad 

  Pakistan Muslim League (N) 
  Muttahida Majlis-e-Amal 
  Awami National Party 
  Pakistan Tehreek-e-Insaf

Years: 1937–1947 (colonial era)

See also 
 List of prime ministers of Pakistan
 List of presidents of Pakistan
 Chief Secretary Khyber Pakhtunkhwa
 List of chief ministers of Punjab
 List of chief ministers of Sindh
 List of chief ministers of Balochistan

References

External links
Functions Of Chief Minister’s Secretariat
Khyber Pakhtunkhwa Assembly

Khyber Pakhtunkhwa politicians
Khyber Pakhtunkhwa